Enoé Margarita Uranga Muñoz (born May 1, 1963) is a Mexican politician. She was elected to the 111th Congress from Federal District on the Party of the Democratic Revolution ticket. In Congress, Uranga is the Secretary of the Commission on Human Rights.

Uranga was the first female openly homosexual member of a state legislature in the country's history. She has also participated in the Mexican LGBT rights movement since the 1980s.

Career
Uranga is a graduate of the Free University of Berlin and the Universidad Autónoma Metropolitana.

From 2000 to 2003, she served as president of the Human Rights Commission of the Federal District Legislative Assembly.

References

External links
 Website
 Profile  on Mexican Congress website

Members of the Chamber of Deputies (Mexico) for Mexico City
Politicians from Mexico City
Women members of the Chamber of Deputies (Mexico)
Mexican LGBT politicians
Mexican LGBT rights activists
Lesbian politicians
Party of the Democratic Revolution politicians
1963 births
Free University of Berlin alumni
Living people
21st-century Mexican politicians
21st-century Mexican women politicians
LGBT legislators
Deputies of the LXI Legislature of Mexico